Jung Ho-keun (born September 28, 1964) is a South Korean actor and shaman, who mostly was a supporting actor in television dramas.

In 2008, Jung played the leading role in a stage musical production of Hi Franceska, adapted from Hello Franceska, the quirky TV sitcom about a hapless human in a family of vampires. It was held at the National Museum of Korea.
In 2015, Jung became a shaman.

Filmography

Television drama

Film

Musical theatre

References

External links

1964 births
Living people
Male actors from Seoul
South Korean male television actors
South Korean male film actors
South Korean male musical theatre actors
Chung-Ang University alumni
Korean shamans